Katrineholm Värmbol BS, KVBS, Katrineholms Bandy, is a bandy club in Katrineholm in Sweden, founded in 2007. The club was playing in Elitserien, the top-tier of Swedish bandy, for the 2009–10 season, but have played in the second level Allsvenskan all other seasons so far.

The club was created by fusioning the bandy department of the multi-sport club Katrineholms SK with the bandy club Värmbol-Katrineholm BK.

References

Bandy clubs in Sweden
Bandy clubs established in 2007
2007 establishments in Sweden
Sport in Katrineholm